Mohd Hazwan Zainun (born 31 December 1987, in Kedah) is a Malaysian footballer currently playing as a midfielder for MISC-MIFA.

Known as "Pak Leh" by fans, Hazwan is a product's of Kedah President Cup squad and was promoted to senior team for season 2007–08.

References

1987 births
Malaysian people of Malay descent
Malaysian footballers
People from Kedah
Living people
Perlis FA players
MISC-MIFA players
Association football midfielders